A Medal for Benny is a 1945 American film directed by Irving Pichel. The story was conceived by writer Jack Wagner, who enlisted his long-time friend John Steinbeck to help him put it into script form. The film was released by Paramount Pictures. The film is also known as Benny's Medal.

Plot
Benny Martin leaves his small town of Pantera and joins the Army after getting in trouble with the police. While he is away, his girlfriend (Lolita) is romanced by Joe.  Although she has not heard from Benny in months, she refuses Joe’s advances, wanting to stay loyal to Benny.  She eventually falls for Joe and agrees to marry him but then finds out that Benny was killed in action and has been awarded the Medal of Honor posthumously.  Meanwhile, the Pantera mayor plans a rally for the medal presentation to Benny’s father and intends to use a beautiful house for the event so as not to embarrass the town by having the medal presented at the modest Martin residence. However, Benny’s father Charley, refuses to go along with the ruse and instead the medal ceremony takes place at his home.  In his speech, Charley says that Benny will live on in his and Lolita's hearts. Lolita then tells Joe that she cannot marry him yet, because it might break Charley's heart.

Cast

 Dorothy Lamour as Lolita Sierra
 Arturo de Córdova as Joe Morales
 J. Carrol Naish as Charley Martin
 Mikhail Rasumny as Raphael Catalina
 Fernando Alvarado as Chito Sierra
 Charles Dingle as Zach Mibbe
 Frank McHugh as Edgar Lovekin
 Rosita Moreno as Toodles Castro
 Douglass Dumbrille as General
 Grant Mitchell as Mayor of Pantera
 Max Wagner as Jake

Accolades

Awards
 Golden Globe Award for Best Supporting Actor (J. Carrol Naish)

Nominations
 Academy Award for Best Supporting Actor (J. Carrol Naish)
 Academy Award for Best Story (John Steinbeck & Jack Wagner)

References

External links
 
 
 
 

1945 films
1945 drama films
American drama films
American black-and-white films
Films scored by Victor Young
Films based on works by John Steinbeck
Films directed by Irving Pichel
Films featuring a Best Supporting Actor Golden Globe winning performance
Films set in California
Films set on the home front during World War II
Paramount Pictures films
1940s English-language films
1940s American films